Alberto Lewis Crane (born July 14, 1976) is an American former mixed martial artist, submission grappler and Brazilian Jiu-Jitsu instructor. He has fought in the Ultimate Fighting Championship and is a former King of the Cage and Ring of Fire lightweight champion. He is the founder of Legacy Jiu-jitsu Academy.

Biography
Crane moved to Brazil shortly after high school to train at the Gracie Barra academy in Rio de Janeiro, and then Belo Horizonte full-time.  He holds a black belt in Brazilian Jiu-Jitsu under Vinicius Magalhaes (Draculino) and Carlos Gracie Jr. Upon returning to New Mexico, Crane began teaching Brazilian Jiu-Jitsu and opened two academies, one in Santa Fe and one in Albuquerque. Crane is credited as the first American Brazlian Jiu-jitsu black belt of Gracie Barra.

Mixed martial arts
He started MMA in 2002 in a King of the cage event in New Mexico. After a 2-year break, Crane signed with the UFC in 2007 and lost his UFC debut against Roger Huerta at UFC 74 via TKO in round three. In his second UFC fight against Kurt Pellegrino, Crane did not take advantage of a high kick early enough in the first round. Crane was defeated via TKO in the second round.

Brazilian Jiu-Jitsu Academy
Crane was owner of the Brazilian Jiu-Jitsu Academy through 2007, selling the Academy when he moved to the L.A. Basin.

Legacy Jiu-Jitsu
Alberto Crane founded Legacy Jiu-Jitsu in Encino, California, in January 2009. The Academy focuses on Brazilian Jiu-Jitsu, Mixed Martial Arts and Muay Thai. Legacy now has locations in Burbank, Glendale and Pasadena.

Instructor lineage
Mitsuyo Maeda → Carlos Gracie, Sr. → Helio Gracie → Carlos Gracie Jr. → Vinicius Magalhães → Alberto Crane

Personal life
Alberto and his wife have three children, son Sevan and twin daughters Sona and Serineh, who were born on November 25, 2008.

Championships and accomplishments
Mixed Martial Arts
King Of The Cage Lightweight Champion
Ring Of Fire Lightweight Champion
Brazilian Jiu-Jitsu
1998 IBJJF Pan Am Championship Bronze Medalist
1998 IBJJF World Championships Bronze Medalist
1999 Brazilian Team Title Championship - 1st Place
1999 IBJJF World Championship Silver Medalist
1999 Brazilian Nationals Bronze Medalist in (Purple Belt Middle Weight) 
1999 Brazilian Nationals Bronze Medalist in (Purple Belt Open Weight)
2000 IBJJF Pan Am Championship Silver Medalist
2001 Brazilian National Championship—3rd place (Brown Belt lightweight) 
2002 IBJJF Pan Am Championship Bronze Medalist (Black Belt)
2002 Brazilian Team Title Championship—1st place (part of brown/black belt lightweight team)
2002 IBJJF World Championship Bronze Medalist( Black Belt, Closed Bracket with Teammates)
2012 1st Place - Las Vegas International Open IBJJF Master Division
2012 1st Place - American Nationals IBJJF Championship Master Division
2012 1st Place - Long Beach International Open IBJJF Master Division
2013 1st Place - Abu Dhabi Pro US Nationals Master Division
2013 1st Place - San Francisco International Open Master Division
2013 1st Place - Las Vegas Spring International Open IBJJF Master Division
2013 1st Place - LA Open NABJJF Master Division
2013 1st Place - Munich International Open IBJJF Master Division
2014 1st Place - Five Grappling California 1 - Black Belt Master Division
2014 1st Place - Five Grappling Nevada 1 - No Gi Expert Division
2014 1st Place - European No-Gi IBJJF Championship Master Division 
2014 1st Place - Grapplers Quest UFC Expo - No Gi Master Expert Division
2014 1st Place - Grapplers Quest UFC Expo - Black Belt Master Division
2015 1st Place - Abu Dhabi Pro US Nationals Master Open Weight Division
2015 1st Place - IBJJF World No-Gi Championship Master Division

Mixed martial arts record 

|-
|  Win
| align=center| 15–5
| Aranik Montero
| Submission (heel hook)
| Fighting Marcou Arena 2
| 
| align=center| 1
| align=center| N/A
| Palavas-les-Flots, Herault, France
| 
|-
|  Win
| align=center| 14–5
| Gabe Rivas
| Submission (armbar)
| KOTC: Turning Point
| 
| align=center| 1
| align=center| 2:23
| Tarzana, California, United States
| 
|-
|  Win
| align=center| 13–5
| Ludwing Salazar
| Submission (Achilles lock)
| XVT 5: Franca vs. Kheder
| 
| align=center| 1
| align=center| 2:27
| Cartago, Costa Rica
| 
|-
|  Loss
| align=center| 12–5
| Albert Rios
| Decision (unanimous)
| Called Out MMA II
| 
| align=center| 3
| align=center| 5:00
| Ontario, California, United States
| 
|-
| Loss
| align=center| 12–4
| Tony Hervey
| KO (punches)
| KOTC: Militia
| 
| align=center| 1
| align=center| 0:12
| Highland, California, United States
| 
|-
| Win
| align=center| 12–3
| Eric Regan
| Submission (triangle choke)
| RITC 123- Rage in the Cage 123
| 
| align=center| 1
| align=center| 2:20
| Chandler, Arizona, United States
| 
|-
| Win
| align=center| 11–3
| Brad Nordquist
| Submission (rear-naked choke)
| KOTC: Goodfellas
| 
| align=center| 1
| align=center| 1:19
| Albuquerque, New Mexico, United States
| 
|-
| Win
| align=center| 10–3
| Richard Villa
| Submission (rear-naked choke)
| EDP: Breaking Point
| 
| align=center| 1
| align=center| N/A
| Rio Rancho, New Mexico, United States
| 
|-
| Win
| align=center| 9–3
| Adrian Valdez
| Submission (guillotine choke)
| Rage in the Cage 113
| 
| align=center| 1
| align=center| 1:35
| Albuquerque, New Mexico, United States
| 
|-
| Loss
| align=center| 8–3
| Simon Marini
| Decision (unanimous)
| Ultimate Cage Wars 12
| 
| align=center| 3
| align=center| 5:00
| Winnipeg, Manitoba, Canada
| 
|-
| Loss
| align=center| 8–2
| Kurt Pellegrino
| TKO (punches)
| UFC Fight Night 12
| 
| align=center| 2
| align=center| 1:52
| Las Vegas, Nevada, United States
| 
|-
| Loss
| align=center| 8–1
| Roger Huerta
| TKO (punches)
| UFC 74
| 
| align=center| 3
| align=center| 1:50
| Las Vegas, Nevada, United States
| 
|-
| Win
| align=center| 8–0
| Jeremy Crowe
| Submission (crucifix)
| PNRF: Inferno
| 
| align=center| 1
| align=center| 1:03
| Santa Fe, New Mexico, United States
| 
|-
| Win
| align=center| 7–0
| Richie Reyes
| Submission (omoplata)
| PNRF: Explosion
| 
| align=center| 1
| align=center| 0:28
| Santa Fe, New Mexico, United States
| 
|-
| Win
| align=center| 6–0
| John Mahlow
| Submission (choke)
| KOTC 36: Albuquerque
| 
| align=center| 2
| align=center| 2:41
| Albuquerque, New Mexico, United States
| 
|-
| Win
| align=center| 5–0
| Takuhito Hida
| Submission (armbar)
| ZST: Grand Prix – Final Round
| 
| align=center| 1
| align=center| 1:26
| Tokyo, Japan
| 
|-
| Win
| align=center| 4–0
| Christian Carvalho
| Submission (rear-naked choke)
| ROF 10: Intensity
| 
| align=center| 1
| align=center| 5:56
| Castle Rock, Colorado, United States
| 
|-
| Win
| align=center| 3–0
| Javier Vazquez
| Decision (split)
| KOTC 21: Invasion
| 
| align=center| 3
| align=center| 5:00
| Albuquerque, New Mexico, United States
| 
|-
| Win
| align=center| 2–0
| Joe Vigil
| Submission (triangle choke)
| KOTC 20 - Crossroads
| 
| align=center| 1
| align=center| 3:17
| Bernalillo, New Mexico, United States
| 
|-
| Win
| align=center| 1–0
| Nick Shadwick
| Submission (rear-naked choke)
| KOTC 14 - 5150
| 
| align=center| 1
| align=center| 1:39
| Bernalillo, New Mexico, United States
|

See also 
List of male mixed martial artists

References

External links
 
 
Bjjheroes.com

American practitioners of Brazilian jiu-jitsu
People awarded a black belt in Brazilian jiu-jitsu
Living people
American male mixed martial artists
Mixed martial artists from New Mexico
Lightweight mixed martial artists
Mixed martial artists utilizing Brazilian jiu-jitsu
1976 births
Ultimate Fighting Championship male fighters